The 2009–10 Rhode Island Rams men's basketball team represented the University of Rhode Island in the 2009–10 college basketball season. This was head coach Jim Baron's ninth season at Rhode Island. The Rams compete in the Atlantic 10 Conference and played their home games at the Ryan Center. They finished the season 26–10, 9–7 in A-10 play and lost in the semifinals of the 2010 Atlantic 10 men's basketball tournament. They were invited to the 2010 National Invitation Tournament where they advanced to the semifinals before falling to North Carolina.

Roster
Source

Schedule and results

|-
!colspan=9 style=| Regular Season

|-
!colspan=9 style=| Atlantic 10 tournament

|-
!colspan=9 style=| NIT

References

Rhode Island
Rhode Island
Rhode Island Rams men's basketball seasons
Rhode
Rhode